Quercus aquifolioides is a species of oak native to south-central China and Tibet. It is in the subgenus Cerris, section Ilex. It is a shrub or small tree adapted to high elevations.

References

aquifolioides
Trees of China
Endemic flora of China
Plants described in 1916